Anjō City Gymnasium (安城市体育館, Anjō-shi Taiikukan) is an arena in Anjo, Aichi, Japan. It is the home arena of the Aisin AW Areions Anjo of the B.League, Japan's professional basketball league.

References

External links
Anjo Sports Park

Basketball venues in Japan
Aisin AW Areions Anjo
Indoor arenas in Japan
Sports venues in Aichi Prefecture
Sports venues completed in 1979
1979 establishments in Japan
Anjō, Aichi